The culture of Hong Kong is primarily a mix of Chinese and Western influences, stemming from Lingnan Cantonese roots and later fusing with British culture due to British colonialism (Traditional Chinese: 粵英薈萃). As an international financial center dubbed "Asia’s World City", contemporary Hong Kong has also absorbed many international influences from around the world. Moreover, Hong Kong also has indigenous people and ethnic minorities from South and Southeast Asia, whose cultures all play integral parts in modern day Hong Kong culture. As a result, after the 1997 transfer of sovereignty to the People's Republic of China, Hong Kong has continued to develop a unique identity under the rubric of One Country, Two Systems.

History

Languages and writing systems

Spoken languages

English and Chinese are the two official languages of Hong Kong. During the British colonial era, English was the sole official language until 1978 but has remained a strong second language in Hong Kong. As the majority of the population in Hong Kong are descendants of migrants from China's Canton Province, the vast majority speak standard Cantonese or other Yue Chinese varieties as a first language, with smaller numbers of speakers of Hakka Language or the Teochew dialect of Southern Min. In addition, immigrants and expatriates from the West and other Asian countries have contributed much to Hong Kong's linguistic and demographic diversity.

Hong Kong Cantonese

Hong Kong Cantonese is the Cantonese language spoken in Hong Kong. Although it is not one of the Hong Kong indigenous languages, it is the most widely spoken language in Hong Kong nowadays. The Hong Kong style of Cantonese contains many loanwords from English, and also some from Japanese, due to Japan being one of Hong Kong's biggest trade partners and the popularity of Japanese pop culture in the city in the past few decades. Nevertheless, Hong Kong Cantonese is still mutually intelligible with the Cantonese spoken by Cantonese people from mainland China or overseas Chinese of Cantonese ancestry. Cantonese is also the primary language used in Hong Kong cultural products (pop songs, movies, etc.).

One distinctive trait of Hong Kong's Cantonese is that, due to British cultural influences, Hong Kongers are noted to have a habit of sprinkling their Cantonese with English words, resulting in a new speech pattern called "Kongish".

Non-Cantonese Sinitic languages
Hakka language (Traditional Chinese: 客家話) is commonly used in many walled villages (Traditional Chinese: 圍村) in New Territories and Hakka ethnic communities in Hong Kong, being one of the indigenous languages for Hong Kong indigenous peoples. Hakka is, like Cantonese and Mandarin, a member of the Chinese language family, but has close to zero mutual intelligibility with either. Hakka people also has a distinct culture, differing from Cantonese also in terms of traditional architecture, music, cuisine, and other customs.

Waitau language (Jyutping: Wai4 tau4 waa2; Traditional Chinese: 圍頭話), another of Hong Kong's indigenous languages, is mostly spoken by the older generation living in walled villages in New Territories. Lastly, the Tanka people (Traditional Chinese: 蜑家人) from the fishing villages is another group of Hong Kong indigenous peoples. Their language, Tanka (Traditional Chinese: 蜑家話), with their own version of Cantonese, is another form of Hong Kong indigenous languages.

Government linguistic policy
Since the 1997 handover, the government has adopted the "biliterate and trilingual" (Jyutping: Loeng3 man4 saam1 jyu5; Traditional Chinese: 兩文三語, literally "two writing systems and three languages") policy. Under this principle, "Chinese" (somewhat ambiguously) and English must both be acknowledged as official languages, with Cantonese being acknowledged as the de facto official (at least spoken) variety of Chinese in Hong Kong, while also accepting the use of Mandarin (Traditional Chinese: 普通話) in certain occasions.

Writing systems

In terms of writing systems, Hong Kongers write using Traditional Chinese characters, which not only employ, under varying circumstances, variant and classical characters used since imperial years, but also cover all of the words in Mandarin-based Vernacular Chinese, the language in which government documents and most works of literature are written. With the aid of Cantonese characters invented by Hong Kongers, the Cantonese language can now be written verbatim, and written Cantonese have been becoming more prevalent since the turn of the 21st century, especially in less formal spheres such as internet forums and advertisements.

Cultural identity
156 years of rule as a separate British colony, as well as political separation from the rest of Lingnan have resulted in a unique local identity. Elements of traditional Cantonese culture combined with British influences have shaped Hong Kong in every facet of the city, spanning from law, politics, education, languages, cuisines, and the way of thinking. It is for this reason that many Hong Kongers are proud of their culture (such as the Cantonese language, which has a 1000-year-long history and a rich heritage of traditional songs and poems) and generally refer themselves as "Hongkongers" (Traditional Chinese: 香港人), to distinguish themselves from the Han Chinese from mainland China (whose culture developed independently). The sense of Hong Kong people denying their unique identity and nationality has increased over time. This is due to the rising phenomena of conflicts between Hong Kongers and the Mainlanders.

Academic Kam Louie described Hong Kong's colonial past as creating a "translation space where Chinese-ness was interpreted for 'Westerners' and Western-ness translated for Chinese."

After the handover of Hong Kong, the University of Hong Kong surveyed Hong Kong residents about how they defined themselves. In its latest poll published in June 2022, 39.1% of respondents identified as Hong Konger, 31.4% as Hong Konger in China, 17.6% as Chinese, 10.9% as Chinese in Hong Kong, and 42.4% as mixed identity.

Hong Kong's 'identity crisis' did not arise only because of conflicts between 'original' Hong Kong people and mainland China. As Hong Kong was developed from a fishing village into an international financial city, many middle class individuals yearned for Western or international lifestyles and culture. The mix of east and west, old and new, has offered Hong Kong people a diverse variety of choices but at the same time confusions. The rapid growth and prosperity and population happened in the 1960s to 1980s when the world was also influenced by globalisation.

Society

In Hong Kong, traditional Confucian-derived values such as "family solidarity", "courtesy" and "saving face" carry significant weight in the minds of the people. Hong Kong's mainstream culture is derived from and heavily influenced by the Cantonese from the neighbouring province of Guangdong ("Gwongdung" in Cantonese) and their culture, which is considerably different from those of other Han Chinese people. There are also small communities of Hakka, Hokkien, Teochew and Shanghainese people in Hong Kong.

Structurally, one of the first laws to define people's relationships was the Hong Kong Matrimonial Ordinance passed in 1972. The law set the precedent of banning concubinage and same sex marriages with a strict declaration for heterosexual relationships with one partner only. Other economic changes include families in need of assistance due to both parents working. In particular, foreign domestic helpers have become an integral part of the household since the late 1980s.

Architecture

In terms of architecture, Hong Kong shows Cantonese, British, and indigenous influences. She has several styles of architecture, most notably Cantonese architecture and British architecture. The former is due to the presence of a large number of people with Cantonese ancestry, and the latter is most commonly seen in government buildings due to the Britons being the rulers of the city. Hong Kong's indigenous peoples also have their own styles, namely walled villages and pang uk. The major architectural styles that can be found in Hong Kong include:

Hong Kong also contained some Chinese Renaissance style architectures such as King Yin Lei at 45 Stubbs Road, and St Mary's Church of Sheng Kung Hui (Anglican Communion) in Hong Kong Island.

Visual arts

Fine arts
Hong Kong supports a variety of artistic activities. The Hong Kong Arts Centre in Wanchai offers a variety of performance venues and galleries, and is supportive of other arts organisations, while Oi! arts center, located inside the historic Royal Hong Kong Yacht Club, aims to promote visual arts in Hong Kong by providing a platform for art exhibitions, forums and other art-related activities. At the international level, Hong Kong hosts the leading contemporary art fair Art Basel in Asia and is a center for new media art with venues such as Microwave International New Media Arts Festival and Videotage. Even in less urban areas of the city, Hong Kongers have also built creative oases such as the Cattle Depot Artist Village and the Fo Tan artistic community. Contemporary visual artists from Hong Kong include Nadim Abbas, Amy Cheung, Choi Yan-chi, Ming Fay, Lai Cheuk Wah Sarah, Tsang Tsou Choi, Ho Sin Tung and Eric Siu.

Hong Kong has recently seen a boom in independent art groups.

Cantonese fine arts
Hong Kong also hosts several styles of Lingnan (Cantonese) fine arts, including the Lingnan styles of painting and bonsai. For example, Yeung Sin-sum, who is venerated as "the last master of the Lingnan school of painting", is based (though not born) in Hong Kong. Hong Kong also has an active club supporting Lingnan penjing (English website).

Hong Kong is also home to modern ink painting, which infuses traditional Chinese ink painting with experimental techniques and approaches. Prominent artists in this field include Lui Shou-kwan, Liu Kuo-sung, and Eddy Chan.

Graffiti art

Graffiti art (Traditional Chinese: 塗鴉) is abundant on Hong Kong streets. The Hong Kong style of graffiti art ranges from calligraphy using Chinese characters to satires against politicians. It is technically illegal in Hong Kong, but lax law enforcement results in the proliferation of graffiti art. Nowadays, graffiti art is omnipresent in the streets of Hong Kong, especially in the busier districts such as Mongkok. The work of Tsang Tsou Choi, one of the most prominent Hong Kong graffiti artists, even had his work sold for more than 50,000 Hong Kong dollars.

Nowadays, many Hong Kongers have started regarding graffiti arts as a symbol of their city and host activities promoting graffiti art.

Comics

Hong Kong comics (Traditional Chinese: 香港漫畫) are Hong Kong-based comic books that have provided an avenue of expression long before the arrival of television. While readership has fluctuated through different decades, the art form is one of the most consistent in terms of providing highly affordable entertainment. Hong Kong comics are regularly available at news stands in most street corners. Characters such as Old Master Q, Chinese hero and many others have showcased Han Chinese artwork and stories (especially Cantonese ones). Japanese manga have also been translated and fused into local comics libraries.

Canton porcelain

Hong Kongers, like their fellow Cantonese, have also dabbled in Canton porcelain. Canton porcelain (Traditional Chinese: 廣彩), also called "Cantonese porcelain", is a distinct style of porcelain that originated from Canton City, the center of Lingnan culture. It primarily involves a specific set of techniques that enable Cantonese to get various colours onto white porcelain, resulting in porcelain products that are unusually bright and colourful. Hong Kongers has worked on Canton porcelain in the early 20th century and exported their products even to the Western world. Nowadays, however, as the city has shifted her focus to service and finance, it is mostly hobbyists who would spend time on this style of porcelain art.

Performing arts

Music

Cantonese opera
Cantonese opera is one of the major categories in Han Chinese opera, originating in southern China's Cantonese culture. Like all branches of Han Chinese opera, it is an art form involving music, singing, martial arts, acrobatics, and acting. Features particular to Cantonese opera include being sung in the Cantonese language, plus its heavy use of makeup and headdresses. Cantonese opera also uses a distinct set of musical instruments. Hong Kong also has a distinct style of Cantonese opera (Traditional Chinese: 神功戲, literally "opera using effort of gods") specifically played during Cheung Chau Bun Festival. The art form carries a national identity that goes as far back as the first wave of immigrants to arrive in the 1950s. Nowadays, Sunbeam Theatre is one of the places that hold the tradition.

Pop music

Cantopop (Traditional Chinese: 粵語流行曲), also called HK-pop, has dominated and become synonymous with local music culture since its birth in Hong Kong, though the gradual fall of Cantopop in the mid-1990s had given rise to other forms of pop culture, mainly Japanese, Korean, and western music. Still, Cantopop enjoys considerable popularity in Cantonese communities across the world. Nowadays, the global influence of Mandarin has slightly influenced the style. Mandopop from Taiwan is gaining ground. Most artists are essentially multilingual, singing in both Cantonese and Mandarin. Hong Kong English pop, Japanese, Korean, and western music are also popular among Hong Kongers.

Classical music

Western classical music is also widely appreciated by many Hong Kong people. Many schools provide free musical instrument lessons to their students.  There are also quite a number of professional, amateur and student orchestras performing regularly. The best known orchestra is the Hong Kong Philharmonic Orchestra  . The Orchestra was originally called the Sino-British Orchestra, it was renamed the Hong Kong Philharmonic Orchestra in 1957 and became a professional orchestra in 1974.  The Orchestra is currently under the direction of Music Director Jaap van Zweden. It won the Gramophone Orchestra of the Year Award 2019.  

Another well known orchestra is Hong Kong Sinfonietta  (Chinese: 香港小交響樂團). Established in 1990, one of its main focuses of HK Sinfonietta is to promote classical music to the general public.  In 2002, the conductor and music director  Wing-sie Yip (葉詠詩)  joined the orchestra as the first woman conductor in Hong Kong. She has broadened the base of classical music lovers in the city.

An amateur orchestra organised by the Hong Kong Medical Association, also called the Hong Kong Doctors Orchestra is an orchestra formed in 1989 by a group of doctors who loved classical music.  This orchestra has performed in many charity events every year.  Its aim is to care for patients and the society not just by medicines but also by beautiful music!

For Hong Kong youths who are interested in becoming professional musicians, they can attend the Hong Kong Academy for Performing Arts where they can obtain a master's degree, bachelor honours degree in Music majoring in a musical instrument.  There are also part-time courses offered by the Academy accredited by the Hong Kong Council for Accreditation of Academic and Vocational Qualifications. Many graduates have become professional players and music teachers.

Theatres
Hong Kong theatres include:
 Aurora Theatre Hong Kong
 Hong Kong Cultural Centre
 Ko Shan Theatre
 Lyric Theatre
 Star Hall
 Tea House Theatre
 The Hub
 Xiqu Centre, West Kowloon
 Yau Ma Tei Theatre

Cinema

The Hong Kong cinema (Cantonese: 港產片) industry has been one of the most successful worldwide, especially during the second half of the 20th century. Having received international recognition for directors such as Wong Kar-wai, it has remained a moderate level of prominence despite a severe slump starting in the mid-1990s. Martial artists and film stars such as Jackie Chan and Bruce Lee are known globally, especially in Chinese settlements overseas, historically most of whom have been of Cantonese ancestry and enjoy Cantonese-language entertainment. Many other Hong Kongers actors have transitioned over to Hollywood, including Chow Yun-fat and John Woo.

Hong Kong humour
The cinema of Hong Kong is noted for its brands of martial arts movies and comedy. The latter is said to have its own style of humour, which has been termed "Hong Kong humour" (Traditional Chinese: 港式幽默) - alluding to British humour. It is said to be characterised by black comedy and, more distinctively, Mo lei tau, and may have been influenced by British humour.

Television dramas

Locally produced television dramas by the free-to-air networks of TVB and ATV have been fairly popular during 1970s to mid 2000.  They have contributed to a unique cultural identity among the Hong Kongers and served as a cultural resource for the Cantonese community worldwide. Many of the well known dramas were exported to South East Asian countries, the US, Canada and the UK in the form of tapes, then VCD/CDs.  Hong Kong was the powerhouse for producing a large number of soap opera TV series in Cantonese dialect. However, the gradual demise of ATV and eventually, TVB, because of worsening quality of TV shows and dramas resulted in greater preference for those produced in China and other Asian nations, namely South Korean, Japanese, and Taiwanese TV shows, which now dominate the latest TV trends in Hong Kong.

Animation

While Hong Kong has had an endless supply from Japanese anime and US Disney animations, China has been trying hard to revitalise the industry. Hong Kong has made contributions in recent years with productions like A Chinese Ghost Story: The Tsui Hark Animation and DragonBlade. Most notably, companies like Imagi Animation Studios located directly in the territory are now pushing 3D-CG animations into the market.

McDull is arguably the most prominent among Hong Kongers animations.

Other performing arts
Except for the above, Hong Kong also has available different kinds of performing arts, including drama, dance, and theater. Hong Kong is home to the first full-time comedy club in Asia, The TakeOut Comedy Club Hong Kong. There are also many government-supported theater companies. More recently, in 2014, Hong Kong had had its first outdoor Shakespeare festival, Shakespeare in the Port performed at Cyberport.

The following performing artist groups originated from and based in Hong Kong have seen modest success even beyond Asia:
Hong Kong Chinese Orchestra, who play Chinese music
Hong Kong Ballet
Hong Kong Philharmonic Orchestra
Hong Kong Sinfonietta

Literary culture

Print media

Magazine and newspaper publishers distribute and print in numerous languages, most notably Vernacular Chinese and English. The printed media, especially tabloids but also broadsheet newspapers, lean heavily on sensationalism and celebrity gossips. While the practice is criticised, it continues to sell papers. The media is relatively free from government interference compared to that of mainland China, and newspapers are often politicised; some have even shown skepticism toward the Chinese government in Beijing.

Broadcasting

In the early 2000s, Hong Kong had two main broadcast television stations, TVB and ATV. The latter was closed in 2016 after a long series of financial issues, and the refusal of the government to renew its broadcasting license. The former, launched in 1967, was the territory's first free-to-air commercial station, and is currently the predominant TV station in the city and can also been seen in the neighbouring Gwongdung province and Macau (via cable). Paid cable and satellite television have also been widespread. Hong Kong's soap dramas, comedy series, and a variety of shows have reached mass audiences throughout the world of Chinese languages, primarily Cantonese communities. Many international and pan-Asian broadcasters are also based in Hong Kong, including News Corporation's STAR TV.

Hong Kong literature

Hong Kong literature is the literature produced in Hong Kong. It started in the early 20th century, where successive waves of migrants from mainland China (mostly of Cantonese ancestry) moved to the British-controlled city in their attempts to escape from the then war-torn China. At first, the educated among these migrants felt much resentment for having to stay in Hong Kong, a "land of Southern Barbarians". Many of their works revolved around expressing such sentiments. Starting from the 1960s, however, Hong Kong developed in such a high pace that writers started writing about Hong Kong herself, with topics ranging from local current events and cultures. Nowadays, Hong Kong literature has been fully developed, with numerous prolific writers producing works such as proses and novels. Hong Kong literature is characterised by its heavy use of daily life scenarios - meaning that romance, humour, and satires are popular genres, although Hong Kong has also produced several prominent wuxia (Traditional Chinese: 武俠) and science fiction writers. Prominent writers of Hong Kong literature include:

Amy Cheung, a writer of romance and proses; Notable works include "Women on the Breadfruit Tree" and "For Love or Money".
Chip Tsao, known for writing proses and articles that discuss cultures (especially Western ones).
Jin Yong, a renowned wuxia writer; Several of his novels have been made into movies and animations.
Ni Kuang, a science fiction writer; He also has had several of his novels made into movies.

Cantonese literature
Lingnan literature was traditionally written in classical Chinese, rather than the peoples' spoken languages. Despite the attempt to create vernacular forms of writing in the late 19th century, the Greater China region still tend to use Vernacular Chinese, a writing system based on Mandarin, not Cantonese (i.e., the peoples' language in the Lingnan region), in writing. Hong Kong is no exception. The vast majority of works of Hong Kong literature were composed in Vernacular Chinese. However, starting from the 21st century, Hong Kong, as a cultural center in the region, has developed a complete writing system for Cantonese. Some writers in the city now advocate composing literature in written Cantonese.

Cuisine

Cuisine holds an important place in Hong Kong culture. From dim sum, hot pot (da been lo), fast food, to the rarest delicacies, Hong Kong carries the reputable label of "Gourmet Paradise" and "World's Fair of Food". Hong Kong cuisine, which is influenced by both Western (mainly British) and Chinese (mainly Cantonese) cultures, is very diverse. Despite these, it is not simply a collection of cuisine from other regions of the world, but also has its own style: an example would be Dai pai dong, casual outdoor dining restaurant, primarily providing Cantonese foods. Cha chaan teng (Traditional Chinese: 茶餐廳, literally "tea restaurant") came from bing sutt ("ice chamber"). In these "tea restaurants", various set meals are served throughout the day for breakfast, lunch, afternoon tea, and dinner, providing eastern (mostly Cantonese) cuisines, British foods such as egg tarts, and Hong Kong foods, such as Hong Kong-style French toast, Hong Kong drinks, Yin-Yeung, and iced lemon tea.

Another Hong Kong speciality is street foods.  Before the 1990s, street foods were offered by hawkers, who are vendors with little carts moving around the streets and selling their traditional snacks.  The best known Hong Kong street foods are curry fish balls, soya-braised cuttlefish, stinky tofu, curry pig skins, pig-blood jelly, red bean, green bean sweet soup, etc. However, after the 1990s, due to food safety regulations, traffic laws and the like, hawkers started to disappear.  They were then replaced by licensed food stores making similar types of snacks. These traditional street foods are still delightful for many Hong Kong people and tourists alike.

There are many special foods and drinks in Hong Kong. Hong Kong-style Cantonese pastries are made by most bakeries in Hong Kong, like egg tarts, pineapple buns, wife cake, jin deui and cream bun. Even pastel de nata, a Portuguese egg tart, is being sold in KFC, the fast-food chain restaurant. Poon choi, a cuisine from Hong Kong's walled villages, also sees popularity among Hong Kongers.

Gallery

Traditional celebrations

There are some distinctive holidays that are celebrated in Hong Kong as a part of eastern culture, and not generally in western countries, except among certain overseas Chinese (especially Cantonese) communities. The best-known is Lunar New Year, which occurs approximately a month after Gregorian New Year, variably in late January or early February. In Lunar New Year, Hong Kong people also go to flower fairs by tradition during Lunar New Year, much like Cantonese from the mainland. Other Han Chinese events include the Dragon Boat Festival, where Zongzi is made by millions at home as part of the tradition, and Mid-Autumn Festival, which involves the massive purchase of Mooncakes from Chinese bakery shops.

There are also several celebrations found only in Hong Kong, namely the Cheung Chau Bun Festival, the Birthday of Che Kung, and Hong Kong Well-wishing Festival.

Religions and beliefs

Religion in Hong Kong is varied, although most Hong Kongers are of Cantonese / Guangdong descent and thus practice the Cantonese branch of Chinese folk religion, which also has elements of Confucian doctrines, Mahayana Buddhism and Taoist ritual traditions. In their Taoist traditions, Hong Kongers also show Cantonese characteristics. They, like the Cantonese people in the mainland, traditionally worship Wong Tai Sin and several other Taoist sea deities, such as Hung Shing and Mazu.

According to official statistics for the year 2010, about 50% of the utter population belongs to organised religions, specifically there are: 1.5 million Hong Kong Buddhists, 1 million Taoists, 480,000 Protestants, 353,000 Catholics, 220,000 Muslims, 40,000 Hindus, 10,000 Sikhs, and other smaller communities. A significant amount of the adherents of non-indigenous Chinese religions, in some cases the majority, are Hong Kong citizens of non-Han descent.

The other half of the population mostly takes part in other Chinese folk religions, which comprehend the worship of local gods and ancestors, in many cases not declaring this practice as a religious affiliation in surveys. The traditional Cantonese religiosity, including Mahayana Buddhism, was generally discouraged during the British rule over Hong Kong, which favoured Christianity. With the end of British rule and the handover of the sovereignty of the city-state to China, there has been a revival of Buddhism and Chinese folk religions.

Hong Kong death traditions
The art of "asking the dead" (Traditional Chinese: 問米) has long been a tradition in Hong Kong. It is often common for living people to want to ask dead people about their lives in the underworld. In these rituals, people bring paper-made garments, paper-made money, and paper-made food to burn them, traditionally believing that this could pass the objects to dead people and give the latter a more comfortable afterlife.

This tradition originated from the Warring States Period in China, at about 476 BCE. This is a common ancient practice in certain parts of Southern China and Hong Kong. However, the number of shops supporting this has been on the decline as people increasingly view this as superstition nowadays.

Leisure

Hong Kongers devote much time to leisure. Mahjong is a popular social activity. Family and friends may play for hours at festivals and on public holidays in homes and mahjong parlours. The sight of elderly men playing Chinese chess in public parks, surrounded by watching crowds, is also common. Other board games such as Chinese checkers are enjoyed by people of all ages.

Among teenagers, shopping, eating out, karaoke and video games are popular, with Japan being a major source of digital entertainment for cultural and proximity reasons. There are also popular local inventions such as the video game Little Fighter Online. In the mid 20th century, Hong Kong had some of the most up-to-date arcade games available outside Japan. Negative associations were drawn between triads and video game arcades. Nowadays, soaring popularity of home video game consoles have somewhat diminished the arcade culture.

Shopping

Hong Kong, nicknamed "shopping paradise", is well known for its shopping district with multiple department stores. Many imported goods transported to Hong Kong have lower tax duties than the international standard, making most items affordable for the general public.

Hong Kong is identified by its materialistic culture and high levels of consumerism. Shops from the lowest end to the most upscale pack the streets in close proximity. Some popular shopping destinations include Mongkok, Tsim Sha Tsui, and Causeway Bay.

Gambling

Gambling is popular in Cantonese culture and Hong Kong is no different. Movies such as the 1980s God of Gamblers have given a rather glamorous image to gambling in Hong Kong. However, gambling is legal only at three established and licensed institutions approved and supervised by the government of Hong Kong: horse racing (in Happy Valley and Sha Tin), the Mark Six lottery, and recently, football (soccer) betting.

Games such as mahjong and many types of card games can be played for pleasure or with money at stake, with many mahjong parlours available. However, mahjong parlours are slowly diminishing as licences are no longer obtainable and, as a result, many old mahjong parlours have been forced to close.

Gambling organisations
The Hong Kong Jockey Club provides the only legal avenue for horse racing and gambling to locals, mostly middle-aged males. The club was established in 1844 by the British colonial government, with the first racecourse being built in Happy Valley. The club closed for a few years during World War II due to the Japanese occupation of Hong Kong. In 1975, lottery Mark Six was introduced.  And in 2002, the Club offered wagerings for football world championship games including the English FA Premier League and the World Cup.

Martial arts

Martial arts in Hong Kong is accepted as a form of entertainment or exercise. T'ai chi is one of the most popular, especially among the elderly. Groups of people practice the style in parks early in the morning. Many forms of martial arts are also passed down from different generations of Cantonese ancestry. (Mainly Cantonese) Styles  like praying mantis, snake fist, and crane are some of the most recognised. The atmosphere is also distinct as people practice outdoor in peaks next to ultra modern high rise buildings.

Sports

Despite limited land resources, Hong Kong continues to offer recreational and competitive sports. Locally, sports in Hong Kong is described as "Club Life". Major multipurpose venues like Hong Kong Coliseum and regular citizen facilities like Macpherson Stadium are available. Internationally, Hong Kong has participated in Olympic Games, and numerous other Asian Games events.

Video games
Arcade games first appeared in Hong Kong in the late 1970s. Most games during the golden age of arcade video games were designed by Japanese companies such as Namco and Taito but licensed by American game developers such as Midway Games and Atari. The first game to center the Hong Kong market was Pong but the most popular were Namco's Pac-man, Taito's Space Invaders and Nintendo's Mario Bros. (released in 1978, 1980 and 1983 respectively). The games were so popular Pac-Man was featured in the 1983 animated film version of the manhua Old Master Q, San-T In 1987 Capcom's Street Fighter enjoyed unprecedented success and unlicensed film adaptations and comics flooded the market, including one by Xu Jingcheng incorporating elements of Chinese martial arts. Similarly SNK's The King of Fighters released in 1994 influenced youth fashion for years and at least 30 local "kung fu comics" were based on the game.

Images from Hong Kong

See also

Hong Kong studies

Symbols of Hong Kong
Hong Kong orchid
Lion Rock

Other Hong Kong cultures
Lion Rock Spirit (aka "Hong Kong's core values")
Walled villages of Hong Kong
Cantonese wedding
Cantonese pre-wedding customs
Villain hitting
Bone collecting
Hong Kong Kids phenomenon
Ngai jong
Pawnbrokers in Hong Kong

Hong Kong cultural policy
Hong Kong cultural policy
Leisure and Cultural Services Department
Museums in Hong Kong

Related cultures
Cantonese culture
British culture
Chinese culture:
Chinese mythology
Mahjong culture

References

Further reading
Chan, Ka-yan and Jennifer Kwok. "Endangered Hong Kong Cultures and Dialects" (Archive). Varsity. School of Journalism and Communication at the Chinese University of Hong Kong, November 2010. Issue 117. p. 40-43.
Cheung, Kwok-hung Stephen. "Traditional folksongs in an urban setting: a study of Hakka Shange in Tai Po, Hong Kong" (Archive). University of Hong Kong, 2004. - Information
 Hong Kong's TV and Film Publication Database, a growing collection of full-text publications (currently 1,850+) published between 1946 and 1997. Developed by HKBU Library